Hunan University (HNU; ; pinyin: Húnán Dàxué), colloquially abbreviated as HúDà (湖大), is a national key public research university located in Changsha, Hunan, and a Double First Class University as well as a member of Project 211 and Project 985 of Chinese universities.

Hunan University is considered one of China's leading engineering research universities.

History 

Hunan University traces its history back to the Yuelu Academy, founded in 976 AD during the Song dynasty. Shuyuan was one form of private educational institution in China; another form was government-sponsored academies including imperial central school Taixue or Guozijian and regional schools. The Yuelu Academy was a venue for Chinese scholars and their students to meet and discuss sophisticated topics in Confucian Studies.

In 976 AD, the Yuelu Academy was founded.

In 1015, the calligraphy of "Yuelu Academy" was written by Emperor Zhenzong of Song.

In 1897, the modern school was founded, initially called Shiwu Institute (Xuetang) (时务学堂). 

In 1903, the modern university was renovated from Yuelu Academy into the Hunan Institute of Higher Education after founding the Shiwu school.

In 1926; the Hunan Institute of Higher Education was renamed Hunan University. In 1937, it was transformed from a provincial university into a national university, renamed the National Hunan University, and designated by the Ministry of education, becoming the fifteenth national university. 

From April 1938 to May 1941, the National Hunan University suffered serious losses and made it difficult to run the school, and during the Battle of Changsha, the National Hunan University was suspended. 

In 1949, the name Hunan University was again adopted and the calligraphy of "Hunan University" was written by Mao Zedong in 1950 as soon as the People's Republic of China was founded. 

In 1959, Hunan University was officially restored after the national readjustment of higher education institutions.

In 1963, it became a key university under the ministry and was subordinated to the First Ministry of Machinery Industry. In 1978, Hunan University's status as one of the 88 National Key Universities in China was reaffirmed. 

In 1996, Hunan University became one of the national key universities sponsored by the major national program "Project 211". In 2000, Hunan University was selected as a member of the "Project 985" to facilitate efforts and progress toward a comprehensive, research-oriented, and internationalized world-class university. 

In November 2010, the National Supercomputing Changsha Center was laid in Hunan University campus under the management and operation of Hunan University. It is the first National Supercomputing Center in Central China and the third of its kind apart from other two national centers situated in Tianjin and Shenzhen.

In 2011, along with nine other Project 985 universities, HNU officially participated in the Excellence League, an alliance of 10 Chinese universities with a strong background in engineering. In 2015, HNU joined the BRICS Universities League, a consortium of leading research universities from BRICS countries.

In 2017, Hunan University was listed in the Double First Class University Plan, the most recent major program for developing top research comprehensive universities in China.

For more than 1000 years, academic activities have been carried on here. In the course of its development from Yuelu Academy to Hunan University, this long-established institution has cultivated a large number of outstanding scholars and has been honored as an "Ancient Millenarian Academy, Famous Centennial University". Additionally, Times Higher Education named Hunan University the "One Thousand Year Old University" due to its incredible longevity and recognized it as "China's oldest higher education institution".

Academics and administration 

Hunan University is a national key university under the direct administration of the Ministry of Education of China, and a member of Project 211 and Project 985, as well as the Double First Class University Plan. In October 2020, Hunan University has been selected as the National Intellectual Property Demonstration University among the first batch of 30 demonstration universities by the China National Intellectual Property Administration and the Ministry of Education of China. The administration is led by a CPC secretary and a president. The current secretary is Deng Wei and the president is Duan Xianzhong.

It has the following colleges and departments:
Architecture
Biology
Business Administration
Chemistry and Chemical Engineering
Chinese Language and Literature
Civil Engineering
Computer Science and Electronic Engineering
Design
Economy and Trade
Educational Science
Electrical and Information Engineering
Robotics
Environmental Science and Engineering
Finance and Statistics
Foreign Languages and International Studies
Journalism and Communication and Film and Television Arts
Law
Marxism Studies
Mathematics and Econometrics
Materials and Engineering
Mechanical Vehicle Engineering
Physical Education
Physics and Microelectronics Science
Yuelu Academy

Cooperation 
Hunan University has established academic cooperation or academic exchange programs with over 160 oversea universities and research institutes since 1990s. Hunan University is one of the Project 985 universities in China to form the BRICS Network University, a network of the BRICS member countries' higher education institutions engaged in cooperation and joining the BRICS Network University.

Students and Academics 
There are more than 30,000 full-time students, including more than 20,800 undergraduates and more than 14,000 graduate students. Hunan University has started to recruit international students since 1990s and is one of the Project 985 universities in China to launch an international student program taught entirely in English. Its campuses home to more than 1,000 international students from over 108 countries and regions in the world, as well as Hong Kong (China), Taiwan (China) and Macau (China), working for bachelor’s degrees, master’s degrees, doctoral degrees or studying the Chinese language and culture through the Self-Financed Program, the Partial Scholarship Program and the Full Scholarship Program. A number of scholarships include the Distinguished Foreign Students Scholarship, Hunan Provincial Government Foreign Students Scholarship, Chinese Government Scholarship, Silk Road Scholarship Program and Confucius Institute Scholarship.

Rankings 
Hunan University is ranked in the top 300 research universities in the world based on several global university rankings such as ARWU, US News, and CWTS Leiden.

General Rankings 
The 2008 Times Higher Education Supplement (THES) World University Rankings ranked Hunan University 15th in China. 
 In the 2020 Academic Ranking of World Universities (ARWU), Hunan University ranked 201–300th in the world and 48–77th in Asia and Oceania region.
As of 2022, the U.S. News & World Report Best Global University Ranking ranked Hunan University 168th globally, 25th in Asia, and 12th in China.

Research Rankings 

 Hunan University ranked 14th worldwide in the 2016 Nature Index Rising Stars. In 2018, Hunan University was elected among 16 universities in the world by Nature, called "Movers and Shakers".  In the Nature Index Annual Table 2022 by Nature Research, which measures the largest groups of papers published in 82 leading high-quality science journals, Hunan University ranked 62nd among the leading research academic institutions globally, 27th in the Asia-Pacific, and 20th in China.
 Hunan University ranked 127th globally and 51st in Asia by the CWTS Leiden Ranking 2022 based on the number of their scientific publications in the period 2017–2020. For the proportion of their scientific publications that rank among the top 1%, 5%, and 10% in their fields by citations, Hunan University ranks 43rd in the world (7th in Asia), 10th globally (3rd in Asia), and 14th in the world (2nd in Asia) respectively.
In 2020, a research paper by Loet Leydesdorff, a famous scientometrician, employs data from 205 China's leading research-intensive universities, including in the CWTS Leiden Ranking 2020, to classify them into three main groups: Top, Middle, and Bottom. Hunan University (with a Z-score of 10.2) ranks 2nd only to Tsinghua University (z=11.0), which leads the "High Group of 32 Universities". 
In 2022, 32 HNU faculty members were included in Clarivate's list of Highly Cited Researchers, placing HNU at # 33 globally and third in China, behind only the Chinese Academy of Science and Tsinghua University.

Subject Rankings 

 Hunan University has been ranked in the top 30th global universities in "engineering" by several international rankings, including U.S. News Rankings, URAP ranking, and NTU Ranking. In the 2022 Academic Ranking of World Universities (ARWU) by Subjects, it ranked in the global top 100 for several specific fields and subjects.

Notable alumni 
Among its prominent alumni are Wang Fuzhi, a celebrated philosopher in Chinese history; Wei Yuan, a reformist who first advocated to learn from the West; Zeng Guofan, the first Chinese to initiate the Modernization Movement (at the time called Yangwu Yundong, a movement to imitate overseas technology and industry) and to make arrangements for a modern factory in China; Zuo Zongtang, a national hero who arranged to build China's first modern navy and took great pains to defend and develop Xinjiang; Guo Songtao, China's first ambassador to a foreign country; Cai E, a major leader in defending the Republic of China; Zhang Fengxuan, the first Chinese to set foot on the continent of Antarctica; and Ci Yungui, the chief designer of China's first super computer. A extensive list of Hunan university alumni can be found here.

See also 
 President of Hunan University
 Hunan University faculty
Hunan University station
 List of universities in China

References

External links 

 
 
University history

 
Universities and colleges in Changsha
Universities and colleges in Hunan
Project 985
Project 211
Plan 111
Ancient universities
976 establishments
Yuelu District
1903 establishments in China
Educational institutions established in 1903
1926 establishments in China
Educational institutions established in 1926